Mumaw is a surname. Notable people with the surname include:

Barton Mumaw (1912–2001), American dancer and choreographer
Katrina Mumaw (born  1983), United States Air Force officer

See also
Mumaw Chapel